The Secretary of State for the Northern Department was a position in the Cabinet of the government of Great Britain up to 1782, when the Northern Department became the Foreign Office.

History
Before the Act of Union, 1707, the Secretary of State's responsibilities were in relation to the English government, not the British. Even after the Union, there was still a separate Secretary of State for Scotland until 1746, though the post was sometimes vacant.  This continued the previous Scottish government post of Secretary of State.

Before 1782, the responsibilities of the two Secretaries of State for the Northern and the Southern Departments were not divided up in terms of area of authority, but rather geographically.  The Secretary of State for the Northern Department was responsible for relations with the Netherlands, Scandinavia, Poland, Russia, and the Holy Roman Empire.  The Secretary of State for the Southern Department was responsible for Ireland, the Channel Islands, France, Spain, Portugal, Switzerland, the states of Italy, and the Ottoman Empire.  He was also responsible for the American colonies until 1768, when the charge was given to the Secretary of State for the Colonies. Domestic responsibilities in England and Wales were shared between the two Secretaries.  After the union with Scotland in 1707, the two secretaries also took responsibility for Scotland when there was no Secretary of State for Scotland in office.

Until 1706, the practice was generally for the senior official to lead the Southern Department, and the junior the Northern Department, with the Northern Secretary being transferred to the Southern Department when a vacancy arose at the latter.  During the reigns of George I and George II, however, the Northern Department began to be seen as the more important, since its responsibilities included the monarchs' ancestral home of Hanover.  During the reign of George III, the two departments were of approximately equal importance.

In 1782, the two Secretaries of State were reformed as the Secretary of State for the Home Department and the Secretary of State for Foreign Affairs.
During the 18th century, Secretaries of State for the Northern Department, if peers, were often Leaders of the House of Lords as well.

Secretaries of State for the Northern Department, 1660–1782
Included:

See also
 Secretary of State England
 Secretary of State for the Southern Department
 Home Secretary

References

Sources

 
Defunct ministerial offices in the United Kingdom
Lists of English politicians
Lists of government ministers of the United Kingdom
Great Britain politics-related lists
.
Kingdom of Great Britain
Northern Department 02, Secretary of State
Northern Department 02, Secretary of State
Northern Department 02, Secretary of State
Northern Department 02, Secretary of State
Northern Department 02, Secretary of State
Northern Department 02, Secretary of State
1660 establishments in England
1782 disestablishments in Great Britain
1660 establishments in the British Empire
1782 disestablishments in the British Empire